The 2002 Haringey London Borough Council election took place on 2 May 2002 to elect all members of Haringey London Borough Council in England. The election was held on new boundaries This was on the same day as other local elections around the country.

Results

|}

Results by Ward

Alexandra

Bounds Green

Bruce Grove

Crouch End

Fortis Green

Harringay

Highgate

Hornsey

Muswell Hill

Noel Park

Northumberland Park

Seven Sisters

St Ann's

Stroud Green

Tottenham Green

Tottenham Hale

West Green

White Hart Lane

Woodside

By-Elections

The by-election was called following the resignation of Cllr. David Prendergast.

The by-election was called following the resignation of Cllr. Josephine L. Irwin.

The by-election was called following the resignation of Cllr. Ross Laird.

The by-election was called following the resignation of Cllr. Barbara Fabian.

References 

Council elections in the London Borough of Haringey
2002 London Borough council elections